Annie Rooney may refer to:

Little Annie Rooney, an American comic strip about a young orphaned girl and her dog
Miss Annie Rooney, a 1942 American comedy-drama film directed by Edwin L. Marin

See also
Little Annie Rooney (disambiguation)